Events from the year 2005 in Croatia.

Incumbents
President: Stjepan Mesić
Prime Minister: Ivo Sanader
Speaker: Vladimir Šeks

Events
January 2 - First round of presidential elections. Stjepan Mesić and Jadranka Kosor enter into the second round.
January 16 - Second round of presidential elections. Stjepan Mesić was reelected president.

Arts and literature
March 5 - Boris Novković won Dora 2005 to become Croatia's representative at the Eurovision Song Contest 2005.

Sport
September 17-25 - Croatia hosted the 2005 Women's European Volleyball Championship in Pula and Zagreb.

Births

Deaths

See also
2005 in Croatian television

References

 
Years of the 21st century in Croatia
Croatia